Phygopoides is a genus of beetles in the family Cerambycidae, containing the following species:

 Phygopoides pradosiae Penaherrera-Leiva & Tavakilian, 2003
 Phygopoides talisiaphila Penaherrera-Leiva & Tavakilian, 2003

References

Rhinotragini